Kholmskaya is a rural locality (a stanitsa) in Abinsky District of Krasnodar Krai, Russia, located on the shores of the Sukhoy Khabl River. Municipally, it is a part of Kholmskoye Rural Settlement in Abinsky Municipal District. Population:  17,271 (2002 Census).

It was founded by the Azov Cossacks in 1863.

References

External links
Official website of Kholmskoye Rural Settlement 

Rural localities in Krasnodar Krai